Gulf of the Farallones is a gulf of the Pacific Ocean off the northern California coast. It extends westward from the opening of the San Francisco Bay and Drakes Bay to the Farallon Islands.

The gulf is home to major shipping lines to the Port of San Francisco, Port of Oakland, and Port of Richmond. The gulf has also historically been used as a dumping ground for various types of waste, including dredging sediment, industrial waste, sunk vessels, and barrels of low-level nuclear waste.  Around 47,800 barrels of nuclear waste were dumped between 1946 and 1970; their location was largely unknown until mapping and monitoring efforts in the 1990s.

Farallones comes from the Spanish farallón meaning sea cliff and is a reference to the islands. Historical names for the gulf include Bahia De Puerto De San Francisco, Ensenada De Los Farallones, and La Bahia De Los Pinos.

References

Further reading
 Beyond the Golden Gate: Oceanography, Oceanography, Geology, Biology, and Environmental Issues in the Gulf of the Farallones. (2000). Edited by Herman A. Karl, John L. Chin, Edward Ueber, Peter H. Stauffer, and James W. Hendley II. U.S. Geological Survey, Circular 1198.

Gulfs of the United States
Gulfs of the Pacific Ocean
Landforms of the San Francisco Bay Area